Bergeggi is a comune (municipality) in the Province of Savona in the Italian region Liguria, located about  southwest of Genoa and about  southwest of Savona.

References

External links
 Official website

Cities and towns in Liguria